August Nilsson (October 15, 1872 in Trollenäs – May 23, 1921 in Stockholm) was a Swedish track and field athlete and tug of war competitor who competed at the 1900 Summer Olympics in Paris, France.

Athletic career
He finished ninth in the shot put event and eighth in the pole vault competition.

He also participated on the Dano-Swedish tug of war team which won the gold medal against opponents France. These were the first Olympic gold medals for Sweden.

See also
 Dual sport and multi-sport Olympians

References

External links 

1872 births
1921 deaths
Swedish male shot putters
Swedish male pole vaulters
Athletes (track and field) at the 1900 Summer Olympics
Olympic athletes of Sweden
Tug of war competitors at the 1900 Summer Olympics
Olympic tug of war competitors of Sweden
Olympic gold medalists for Sweden
Olympic medalists in tug of war
Medalists at the 1900 Summer Olympics
People from Eslöv Municipality